UFC 185: Pettis vs. dos Anjos was a mixed martial arts event held on March 14, 2015, at the American Airlines Center in Dallas, Texas.

Background
The event was the third that the UFC has hosted in Dallas, Texas.

The event was headlined by a UFC Lightweight Championship bout between current champion Anthony Pettis and top contender Rafael dos Anjos.

The co-main event featured a UFC Women's Strawweight Championship bout between current champion Carla Esparza and top contender Joanna Jędrzejczyk.

Matt Brown was scheduled to face Tarec Saffiedine in the main event of UFC Fight Night 60. However, Saffiedine pulled out due to a groin injury and Brown was instead matched up against former UFC Welterweight champion Johny Hendricks at this event.

Vagner Rocha was expected to face promotional newcomer Joseph Duffy at the event. However, Rocha pulled out of the bout in early February and was replaced by Jake Lindsey.

Daron Cruickshank missed weight on his first attempt at the weigh ins, coming in at 157.5 pounds. He was given additional time to make the lightweight limit, but missed weight again, coming in at 157 pounds. Subsequently, he was fined 20 percent of his purse, which went to Beneil Dariush.

Results

Bonus awards
The following fighters were awarded $50,000 bonuses:
Fight of the Night: None awarded
Performance of the Night: Rafael dos Anjos, Joanna Jędrzejczyk, Ross Pearson and Beneil Dariush

See also
List of UFC events
2015 in UFC

References

Ultimate Fighting Championship events
Sports competitions in Dallas
Mixed martial arts in Dallas
2015 in mixed martial arts
March 2015 sports events in the United States